John Davis may refer to:

Academics
John A. G. Davis (1802–1840), professor at the University of Virginia School of Law, shot to death by a student
John Aubrey Davis Sr. (1912–2002), African American activist and political science professor
John Adelbert Davis (1871–1934), American bible college founder
John Davies (lecturer) or Davis (fl. 1816–1850), English chemist and lecturer
John Davis (academic) (1938–2017), English anthropologist and Warden of All Souls College, Oxford
John Emmeus Davis (born 1949), scholar, writer and community organizer
John J. Davis (theologian) (born 1936), American theologian, archaeologist, and Christian educator
John Davis (paediatrician) (born 1923), British emeritus professor of paediatrics
John Jefferson Davis, professor of theology and Presbyterian pastor
John Warren Davis (college president) (1888–1980), African American educator, college administrator, and civil rights leader

Arts & entertainment

Art
John Davis (sculptor) (1936–1999), Australian sculptor
John F. Davis (artist) (born 1958), Australian artist, painter and video editor
John Philip Davis (1784–1862), British portrait and subject painter
John Scarlett Davis (1804–1845), English painter

Fictional characters
John Davis, character in After Many Years
John Davis (EastEnders), fictional character on British soap opera, Eastenders
Sergeant John Davis, a playable character in Call of Duty 2

Films and television
John Davis (producer) (born 1954), American film producer
John Davis (filmmaker) (1944–2015), Australian documentary filmmaker
John A. Davis (born 1961), American animator
John H. Davis (television) (born 1944), American television presenter and journalist

Music
John Davis (singer) (1954–2021), American singer
Blind John Davis (1913–1985), American blues pianist
John Davis (pianist) (born 1957), American classical pianist
John Davis (album), a 2005 album by singer-songwriter John Davis
John Davis and the Monster Orchestra, 1970s band
John Davis (singer-songwriter) (born 1974), Superdrag member
John David Davis (1867–1942), English composer

Writers
John Gordon Davis (1936–2014), Rhodesian writer of adventure novels
John H. Davis (author) (1929–2012), American author
John T. Davis, American author

Law
John Davis (U.S. district court judge) (1761–1847), Massachusetts state representative and federal judge
John Davis (United States Court of Claims judge) (1851–1902), Assistant Secretary of State and judge of Court of Claims
John F. Davis (lawyer) (1907–2000), Clerk of the Supreme Court of the United States
John Warren Davis (judge) (1867–1945), NJ State legislator and Judge, Third Circuit Court of Appeals
Bancroft Davis (John Chandler Bancroft Davis, 1822–1907), Supreme Court Reporter of Decisions, 1883–1902

Military
John Davis (American Civil War sailor) (died 1863), United States Navy, Medal of Honor recipient for actions in 1862
John Davis (American Civil War soldier) (1838–1901), United States Army, Medal of Honor recipient for actions in 1865
John Davis (Medal of Honor, 1881) (1854–1903), United States Navy, Medal of Honor recipient for actions in 1881
John Davis (Medal of Honor, 1898) (1877–1970), United States Navy, Medal of Honor recipient for actions in 1898
Sir John Davis (RAF officer) (1911–1989), Royal Air Force air chief marshal
John Edward Davis (Royal Navy officer) (1815–1877)
John J. Davis (general) (1909–1997), U.S. Army, Military Intelligence
John K. Davis (1927–2019), U.S. Marine Corps
John L. Davis (1825–1889), admiral in the United States Navy
Sir John Davis (British Army officer) (1832–1901), British general
John Davis, officer of the British commando Force 136 in WWII Malaya

Politics

United States
John Davis (Kansas politician) (1826–1901), U.S. Representative from Kansas
John Davis (Massachusetts governor) (1787–1854), Governor of Massachusetts, 1834–1835; 1841–1843
John Davis (Oregon politician), member of the Oregon House of Representatives
John Davis (Pennsylvania politician) (1788–1878), U.S. Representative from Pennsylvania
John H. Davis (diplomat) (1904–1988), U.S. assistant secretary of agriculture and Director of UNRWA
John E. Davis (North Dakota politician) (1913–1990), Governor of North Dakota, 1957–1961
John E. Davis (Texas politician) (born 1960), Texas state representative, 1999–2015
John G. Davis (1810–1866), U.S. Representative from Indiana
John J. Davis (congressman) (1835–1916), United States Representative from West Virginia
John Morgan Davis (1906–1984), Lieutenant Governor of Pennsylvania
John W. Davis (governor) (1826–1907), Governor of Rhode Island
John W. Davis (1873–1955), Democratic U.S. presidential candidate, 1924
John W. Davis (New Jersey politician) (1918–2003), speaker of the New Jersey General Assembly
John Wesley Davis (1799–1859), U.S. Representative from Indiana, Governor of Oregon Territory
John William Davis (Georgia politician) (1916–1992), U.S. Representative from Georgia
John C. Davis, labor economist and U.S. President Harry S. Truman staff member

Other countries
John Francis Davis (1795–1890), British Governor of Hong Kong and minor poet
John Davis (Australian politician) (1817–1893), Australian pastoralist in colonial Western Australia
John Caswell Davis (1888–1953), Canadian senator
Jack Davis (Canadian politician) (1916–1991), Canadian politician from British Columbia

Sports

Baseball
John Davis (pitcher, born 1883) (1883–1946), Negro leagues pitcher
John Davis (pitcher, born 1963) (born 1963), Major League Baseball player
Quack Davis (John Davis), Negro leagues outfielder
Red Davis (John Humphrey Davis, 1915–2002), Major League Baseball third baseman

Cricket
John Brewer Davis (1741–1817), English cricketer
John Davis (cricketer, born 1882) (1882–1963), English cricketer for Derbyshire
John Davis (Worcestershire cricketer) (1884–1951), English cricketer
John Davis (cricketer, born 1939), Welsh cricketer
John Davis (cricketer, born 1943) (1943–2000), English cricketer

Other sports
John Davis (footballer), soccer player
John Davis (offensive lineman) (born 1965), American football offensive lineman
John Davis (tight end) (born 1973), American football tight end
J. Elwood Davis (1892–1974) American football player
J. R. Davis (John Ryland Davis), American college football player
John Davis (rower) (1929–2017), American Olympic rower
John Davis (skier), American para-alpine skier
John Davis (speedway rider) (born 1954), English speedway rider
John Davis (swimmer) (born 1978), New Zealand swimmer
John Davis (weightlifter) (1921–1984), American Olympian, gold medalist
John S. Davis (1898–1985), American head college football coach for the Ottawa University Braves, 1930
John Davis, Jr., (born 1953), American professional boxer and convicted serial killer who fought under the ring name of Steve Hearon

Other people
John Clements Davis (born 1938), American geologist
John Davis (British businessman) (1906–1993), English managing director of the Rank Organisation, later Chairman
John Davis (buccaneer) (alias of Robert Searle), English buccaneer
John Davis (explorer) (1550–1605), English navigator and explorer
John Davis (entrepreneur) (born 1953), American entrepreneur
John Davis (sealer) (1784–1???), American who claimed to have first set foot on Antarctica
John King Davis (1884–1967), Australian explorer and navigator
John Marsh Davis (1931–2009), American architect
John P. Davis (1905–1973), African-American activist and writer
John H. Davis (publisher) (died 1896), African-American newspaper publisher, politician and land speculator in Roanoke, Virginia
John E. Davis (architect) (1891–1961), college football player and architect in Birmingham, Alabama
John Merle Davis (1875–1960), American missionary
John R. Davis Jr. (born 1927), American diplomat

See also
Jack Davis (disambiguation)
John E. Davis (disambiguation)
John W. Davis (disambiguation)
John Warren Davis (disambiguation)
Johnny Davis (disambiguation)
Jon Davis (disambiguation)
Jonathan Davies (disambiguation)
Jonathan Davis (disambiguation)
List of people with surname Davis